John Caven (April 12, 1824 – March 9, 1905) was an Indiana politician and Freemason who served as the 9th and 12th mayor of Indianapolis. He was also a member of the Indiana Senate.

Early life 
Caven was born in Allegheny County, Pennsylvania to Scotch-Irish and English American parents.

Career 
Caven moved to Indianapolis in 1845, began law studies two years later, and opened a practice. In May 1863, Caven, running as a Republican, was elected mayor without opposition. He won a second term in 1865. 
Caven then served two terms in the Indiana Senate (1869–1873), representing Marion County before returning to serve another three consecutive terms (1875–1881) as mayor of Indianapolis. He won a third term as a state senator in 1887.

References

1824 births
1905 deaths
Mayors of Indianapolis
Republican Party Indiana state senators
American people of English descent
American people of Scotch-Irish descent
19th-century American politicians